Jackson Township is a township in Gentry County, in the U.S. state of Missouri.

Jackson Township has the name of an early settler.

References

Townships in Missouri
Townships in Gentry County, Missouri